Todd Woodbridge and Mark Woodforde were the defending champions but did not compete that year.

Pat Cash and Patrick Rafter won in the final 6–2, 6–3 against Ken Flach and David Wheaton.

Seeds
Champion seeds are indicated in bold text while text in italics indicates the round in which those seeds were eliminated.

  Alex O'Brien /  Sandon Stolle (semifinals)
  Jonas Björkman /  Nicklas Kulti (first round)
  Brian MacPhie /  Michael Tebbutt (first round)
  Kent Kinnear /  Dave Randall (first round)

Draw

References
 1996 Rolling Rock U.S. Men's Clay Court Championships Doubles Draw

U.S. Men's Clay Court Championships
1996 U.S. Men's Clay Court Championships